Virginia Hilda Brunette Maxwell Bottomley, Baroness Bottomley of Nettlestone,  (née Garnett, born 12 March 1948) is a British Conservative Party politician and headhunter. She was a Member of Parliament (MP) in the House of Commons from 1984 to 2005. She became a member of the House of Lords in 2005.

Early life and career
Virginia Hilda Brunette Maxwell Garnett was born in Dunoon, Scotland, to Barbara Rutherford-Smith, Jarrow hunger marcher, a teacher and elected Conservative member of the Inner London Education Authority and W. John Garnett CBE, former director of what was then called The Industrial Society, grandson of Cambridge physicist and educational adviser William Garnett and of Sir Edward Poulton, Hope professor of zoology at Oxford. Her paternal aunt was Labour Greater London Council member Peggy Jay. She first met Peter Bottomley, her future husband, when she was 12 years old; they wed in 1967.

Bottomley was educated at Putney High School, an independent school for girls in Putney in southwest London, before going up to the University of Essex to study sociology (BA). She later graduated from the London School of Economics with the degree of Master of Arts (MA).

She began her working life as a social scientist and was a researcher for the Child Poverty Action Group. She has also been a social worker, magistrate (Justice of the Peace), and Chairman of the Inner London Juvenile Court.

Member of Parliament and in government
After unsuccessfully contesting the Isle of Wight in the 1983 general election (34,904 votes), she was elected to Parliament with 21,545 votes in a by-election in 1984 (filling the seat left vacant by the death of Maurice Macmillan, son of former prime minister Harold Macmillan), as the Member for South West Surrey, was PPS to Chris Patten and then to Foreign Secretary Sir Geoffrey Howe, received her first ministerial position in 1988 as a Parliamentary Under-Secretary at the Department of the Environment and was appointed Minister of State at the Department of Health in 1989. She was appointed a member of the Privy Council (PC) upon joining John Major's Cabinet as Secretary of State for Health in 1992, becoming the ninth woman to serve in the British cabinet. She served as Health Secretary until 1995.

Bottomley and Ann Widdecombe have been listed as co-founders of Lady Olga Maitland’s pro-nuclear Women and Families for Defence group.

She served as Secretary of State for National Heritage from 1995 to 1997. During this period, she appeared in the Eurovision Song Contest 1996, wishing luck to the United Kingdom's entrant, Gina G.

After the 1997 general election, she returned to the backbenches, and become a headhunter at Odgers, where she headed and now chairs the company's Board & CEO Practice.

Retirement
She stepped down from the House of Commons when the 2005 general election was called. On 24 June 2005 she was created a life peer with the title Baroness Bottomley of Nettlestone, of St Helens in the County of Isle of Wight, the parish where she was baptised and celebrated her marriage.

Personal life
Bottomley is involved with charitable and academic bodies in addition to business. She was on the founding Council of the University of the Arts, London. She was a Council Member of the Ditchley Foundation and was President of Farnham Castle, Centre for International Briefing. From 2000 until May 2012 she sat on the Supervisory Board of Akzo Nobel, taking over Courtaulds and then ICI. She was a non-executive director of Bupa, a healthcare company. She was on the Advisory Council of the International Chamber of Commerce UK (ICC UK) and the Judge School of Management, Cambridge. Bottomley has been a trustee and is a fellow of the Industry and Parliament Trust. She was National President of the Abbeyfield Society and a Vice-Patron of Carers and of Cruse Bereavement Care. She was a lay canon of Guildford Cathedral, and a Freeman of the City of London.

In  2006, she was elected and installed as Chancellor of the University of Hull, succeeding Lord Armstrong of Ilminster in April 2006. She was also appointed a Deputy Lieutenant of Surrey in March of that year and Sheriff of Hull since 2013. She is the longest serving trustee of The Economist newspaper. 

Virginia Garnett married Peter Bottomley in 1967, after the birth of their eldest child; since 1975 he has been an MP.

During her time in Prime Minister John Major's cabinet, the satirical puppet show Spitting Image often portrayed Major as having an unrequited crush on Bottomley; years later, it was revealed that Major was having an affair with Edwina Currie at the time.

Bottomley's family includes many figures in politics and public life. Her brother, Christopher Garnett, was the chief executive of train operating company GNER. Her aunt Pauline married Roland Hunt who is not connected to Sir Nicholas Hunt, father of Jeremy Hunt who succeeded her as MP.

Her cousins include Peter Jay (the former British Ambassador to the United States and son-in-law to James Callaghan), and Lord Hunt of Chesterton (father of historian and former Labour MP Tristram Hunt).

More distant relatives include Lord Oakeshott of Seagrove Bay and Baron Jay of Ewelme (former FCO PUSS and British Ambassador to France).

Julia Cleverdon married Bottomley's late father, John. Her husband's niece is Kitty Ussher (a former Labour minister).

References

External links
 Debrett's People of Today
 

|-

|-

1948 births
Living people
People from Dunoon
Politicians from London
People educated at Putney High School
Alumni of the University of Essex
Alumni of the London School of Economics
Female members of the Parliament of the United Kingdom for English constituencies
Conservative Party (UK) MPs for English constituencies
British Secretaries of State
English Anglicans
Female members of the Cabinet of the United Kingdom
Secretaries of State for Health (UK)
Members of the Privy Council of the United Kingdom
People associated with the University of Hull
People associated with the University of Surrey
UK MPs 1983–1987
UK MPs 1987–1992
UK MPs 1992–1997
UK MPs 1997–2001
UK MPs 2001–2005
Conservative Party (UK) life peers
Deputy Lieutenants of Surrey
Life peeresses created by Elizabeth II
Governors of the London School of Economics
20th-century British women politicians
21st-century British women politicians
20th-century English women
20th-century English people
21st-century English women
21st-century English people
British monarchists
Wives of knights
Spouses of British politicians